The Global Compact on Refugees is an international agreement, prepared under the auspices of the United Nations, that provides a framework to improve the worldwide response to the needs of refugees.

Governments make pledges under the compact at the Global Refugee Forum regular meeting.

Signatories 
The United Nations General Assembly affirmed the compact (resolution A/RES/73/151) on 17 December 2018. 181 nations voted in favour of the compact, the United States and Hungary voted against, Eritrea, Libya, and the Dominican Republic abstained from the vote.

Reception 
The agreement of the compact was described by Filippo Grandi as the most pivotal moment he had witnessed in his 34 years of working with refugees. Louise Arbour, the United Nations Special Representative for International Migration, described the international agreement as "wonderful", "historic" and "a great achievement for multilateralism."

See also 

 United Nations High Commissioner for Refugees
Convention Relating to the Status of Refugees
 Network for Refugee Voices
 Global Refugee-Led Network
 Global Compact for Migration

References

External links 
 Global Compact on Refugees, official website

United Nations documents
Human migration
History of the United Nations
Humanitarian aid